Jodis inumbrata is a species of moth of the  family Geometridae. It is found in Bhutan and Taiwan.

References

Moths described in 1896
Hemitheini